Maryvale may refer to:

Places
Maryvale, Gauteng, Johannesburg, South Africa
Maryvale, Queensland (Livingstone), Queensland, Australia
Maryvale, Queensland (Southern Downs Region), Queensland, Australia
Maryvale, Toronto, Ontario, Canada, a neighbourhood in the Scarborough section of Toronto
Maryvale, Phoenix, Arizona, United States
Maryvale Station, a pastoral lease in the Northern Territory, Australia
Maryvale, New South Wales, a location and old railway station in Dubbo Regional Council, New South Wales, Australia

Education
Maryvale High School (Cheektowaga, New York), United States
Maryvale Institute a Roman Catholic college in Birmingham, England

See also

Marievale Bird Sanctuary, Gauteng, South Africa
Group 16 Marievale, South African commando
Marieval, Saskatchewan, Canada

Mary (disambiguation)
Vale (disambiguation)